Mattias Sunneborn (born 27 September 1970 in Bunge, Gotland) is a Swedish long jumper.  He was an Olympic finalist in 1996.  He was the 1996 European Indoor Champion and 1995 World Indoor silver medalist.

His personal best jump is 8.21 metres, achieved in June 1996 in Malmö.

As of 2018, he is still an active masters athlete.  He won the M40 400 metres at the 2015 World Masters Athletics Championships just weeks before his 45th birthday.

Sunneborn was in his youth engaged to Sweden's future Minister of Culture and Democracy, Alice Bah Kuhnke.

Competition record

References

1970 births
Living people
Sportspeople from Gotland County
Swedish male long jumpers
Athletes (track and field) at the 1996 Summer Olympics
Athletes (track and field) at the 2000 Summer Olympics
Olympic athletes of Sweden
World Athletics Championships athletes for Sweden
21st-century Swedish people